Hercules: Zero to Hero is a 1999 American animated fantasy film produced by Walt Disney Television Animation. The film is a direct-to-video follow-up to 1997 animated feature Hercules. It was released on August 17, 1999. The film serves as a package film combining three episodes of Hercules: The Animated Series as flashback segments.

Plot
The film briefly gives Hercules' history after defeating Hades (who off-screen succeeded in getting out of the River Styx and gave up his quest for the rule of Olympus), in which Hercules marries Meg and revisits his teenage years. In particular, it shows an adolescent Hercules's enrollment and the beginning of his adventures at the Prometheus Academy, a school for gods and mortals, which Hercules supposedly attended during the time when he was training to be a hero with his mentor, the satyr Philoctetes.

Voice cast
The following characters appear as they did in the corresponding episodes that the film packaged.

 Tate Donovan as Hercules
 Susan Egan as Megara
 James Woods as Hades
 Corey Burton as Zeus
 Robert Costanzo as Philoctetes
 Frank Welker as Pegasus
 Bobcat Goldthwait as Pain
 Matt Frewer as Panic
 Paul Shaffer as Hermes
 Eric Stoltz as Theseus
 Richard Simmons as Physedipus
 Eric Idle as Parenthesis
 Sandra Bernhard as Cassandra
 French Stewart as Icarus
 Diedrich Bader as Adonis
 Jodi Benson as Helen of Troy
 Michael Dorn as Minotaur
 Paddi Edwards as Atropos
 Brad Garrett as Cyclops Head #1
 Wayne Knight as Cyclops Head #2
 Cheryl Freeman as Melpomene
 Bill Fagerbakke as Orthus
 Kathie Lee Gifford as Echidna

Releases
Hercules: Zero to Hero was first released on home video on August 17, 1999.

Reception
Michelle Erica Green of LittleReview gave the film a rating of B+, writing that while the film "lacks the dazzling visuals of the feature film upon which it is based...it's hard not to be charmed", adding "the characters are all clever and original despite their mythic origins". Conversely, Antagony & Ecstasy gave a scathing review, writing that as the film "was assembled of four episodes of the Hercules cartoon that had already aired in 1998 and 1999", it was "perhaps the single grubbiest cash-in of [all the direct-to-video released]", adding "Zero to Hero was already going to be at such a low level of accomplishment even relative to other DTV projects".

In a review, Vern Perry of the Orange County Register described the Disney formula as "Just give 'em what they like. And keep it up.", noting that's what the company has done with these two 1998/1999 releases. He added that this film benefited greatly from the return of some of the original voice cast including Tate Donovan and James Woods.

References

External links
 
 

1999 animated films
American children's animated adventure films
American children's animated fantasy films
Hercules (franchise)
Disney direct-to-video animated films
Direct-to-video interquel films
1999 films
1999 direct-to-video films
1990s American animated films
Disney Television Animation films
DisneyToon Studios animated films
Animated films based on classical mythology
1990s English-language films